Joseph Carey (born 24 June 1975) is an Irish Fine Gael politician who has been a Teachta Dála (TD) for the Clare constituency since the 2007 general election.

Early life
Carey is the son of Donal Carey who was a TD and Senator. He was educated at St. Flannan's College, Ennis, and Galway Institute of Technology, Galway.

Political career
From 1997 to 2007, Carey was a member of Clare County Council. He was elected to Dáil Éireann at the 2007 general election. He was appointed Fine Gael Deputy Spokesperson on Justice, with special responsibility for Juvenile Justice in October 2007. In October 2010, he was appointed as assistant Fine Gael Chief Whip. He was a member of the Joint Oireachtas Committee on Social Protection and the British-Irish Parliamentary Assembly, where he served on the committee for European Affairs. He has previously served as a member of the Dáil Committee on Procedures and Privileges and Fine Gael Spokesperson on Juvenile Justice and Deputy Government Chief Whip.

See also
Families in the Oireachtas

References

External links
Joe Carey's page on the Fine Gael website

 

1975 births
Living people
Fine Gael TDs
Local councillors in County Clare
Members of the 30th Dáil
Members of the 31st Dáil
Members of the 32nd Dáil
Members of the 33rd Dáil
Politicians from County Clare
Alumni of Galway-Mayo Institute of Technology